The 30th Vanier Cup was played on November 19, 1994, at the SkyDome in Toronto, Ontario, and decided the CIAU football champion for the 1994 season. The Western Mustangs won their record sixth championship by defeating the Saskatchewan Huskies by a score of 50-40 in the first Vanier Cup game to go to overtime.

References

External links
 Official website

Vanier Cup
Vanier Cup
1994 in Toronto
November 1994 sports events in Canada